Christmas Goose With Quince (Comic thriller in one act) is a 2012 play by Georgian playwright Miho Mosulishvili.

Plot synopsis
In one ordinary, but got to a big debt, a family of Newlyweds (the husband Michael Danser and the wife Helen Quince) were very lucky, to them the owner of that consortium (Bonifacius) where they work with indecent desire goes the guest for a congratulation of Christmas.

Because of offered a large number of money a young married couple is compelled to serve and will execute all humiliating requirements from his strange guest, the owner of consortium, Gabriel Bonifacius, then because of it when Helen and Michael feel torment oneself, Newlyweds kill Bonifatius.

At this time to newlyweds come Michael's parents, Carlo and Rosalia for a congratulation Christmas too.

When they learn that newlyweds killed Bonifatius, at first they want to hide Helen and Michael, but then start thinking about own wellbeing and begin calls in police. But as it becomes clear, the visitor of consortium didn't die, it we live also healthy leaves the refrigerator where murderers hid his sawn parts of a body. It appears that Bonifatius not the person, but it is an angel who asks everything what sometimes to reflect that we do.

Characters
 Bonifacius - The owner Bonfatius consortium; it is difficult to guess, how old is he
 Michael Danser - The designer in Bonifatius's consortium, but a painter, age 32
 Helen Quince - The manager of marketing in Bonfatius's consortium, age 30
 Carlo - Michael's father, age 63
 Rosalia - Michael's mother, age 60
 Horse from the TV - The horse a racer, age 3

Production
 December 25, 2009 - Iliauni Theatre, Tbilisi, director Guram Bregadze
 June 21, 2013 - Rustavi Drama Theatre (Georgia), director Guram Bregadze, choreographer George Margania, designer Lomgul Murusidze

Publication
 Mikho Mosulishvili: Almost Picasso and on a few Bosch, on the right side (Seven Plays) (Originaltitel: თითქმის პიკასო და ცოტა ბოსხი, მარჯვნიდან).
 "Weihnachtsgans mit Quitten" von Micho Mosulischwili im buch: "Zwischen Orient und Okzident" (Theaterstücke aus Georgien), Verlag Theater der Zeit, 2015,

References
Notes

External links
 MIKHO MOSULISHVILI  (1962 - )
 Almost Picasso and on a few Bosch, on the right side

2009 plays
Plays based on real people
Works by Miho Mosulishvili